Robert Lee Griffith (October 1, 1912 – November 8, 1977) was an American baseball pitcher in the Negro leagues who played for several teams between 1934 and 1951.

A native of Liberty, Tennessee, Griffith served in the US Army during World War II. He was a three-time pitcher in the East-West All-Star Game (1935; 1948–1949), Griffith also played in the Cuba, Dominican Republic, Mexico and Venezuela professional leagues. Listed at 6' 5", 235 lb., he batted and threw right-handed and was nicknamed 'Schoolboy' or 'Big Bill'. Griffith died in Indianapolis, Indiana in 1977 at age 65.

References

External links
 and Baseball-Reference Black Baseball stats and Seamheads

1912 births
1977 deaths
African-American baseball players
American expatriate baseball players in Mexico
United States Army personnel of World War II
Baltimore Elite Giants players
Baseball players from Tennessee
Cafeteros de Córdoba players
Columbus Elite Giants players
Diablos Rojos del México players
Granby Red Sox players
Habana players
Memphis Red Sox players
Mexican League baseball pitchers
Nashville Elite Giants players
Navegantes del Magallanes players
American expatriate baseball players in Venezuela
New York Black Yankees players
Newark Eagles players
People from DeKalb County, Tennessee
Philadelphia Stars players
Tecolotes de Nuevo Laredo players
Washington Elite Giants players
American expatriate baseball players in Cuba
Baseball pitchers